The 2022 Kensington and Chelsea London Borough Council election was held on 5 May 2022. All 50 members of Kensington and Chelsea London Borough Council were  elected. The elections took place alongside local elections in the other London boroughs and elections to local authorities across the United Kingdom.

The Conservative party lost one seat to the Liberal Democrats, but maintained their majority on the council.

Background

History 

The thirty-two London boroughs were established in 1965 by the London Government Act 1963. They are the principal authorities in Greater London and have responsibilities including education, housing, planning, highways, social services, libraries, recreation, waste, environmental health and revenue collection. Some of the powers are shared with the Greater London Authority, which also manages passenger transport, police, and fire.

Kensington and Chelsea has been under Conservative control since its establishment. In the most recent election in 2018, the Conservatives won 36 seats with 51.4% of the vote across the borough; Labour won 13 seats with 33.0% of the vote and the Liberal Democrats won a single seat with 12.4% of the vote. The council had been a target for the Labour Party, who had been expected to perform better following the 2017 Grenfell Tower fire.

Council term 

A Labour councillor for Dalgarno ward, Robert Thomson, resigned in early 2019 because his job required him to relocate. A by-election was held to fill his seat on 21 March 2019, which was won by the Labour candidate Kasim Ali with the Conservatives coming in second place.

Unlike most London boroughs, Kensington and Chelsea will continue with the same ward boundaries it elected councillors under in 2018 as it had been subject to a recent boundary review.

Electoral process 
Kensington and Chelsea, as with all other London borough councils, elects all of its councillors at once every four years, with the previous election having taken place in 2018. The election took place by multi-member plurality block voting, with each ward being represented by two or three councillors. Electors had as many votes as there are councillors to be elected in their ward, with the top two or three being elected.

All registered electors (British, Irish, Commonwealth and European Union citizens) living in London aged 18 or over were entitled to vote in the election. People who lived at two addresses in different councils, such as university students with different term-time and holiday addresses, were entitled to be registered for and vote in elections in both local authorities. Voting in-person at polling stations took place from 7:00 to 22:00 on election day, and voters were able to apply for postal votes or proxy votes in advance of the election.

Previous council composition

Overall Results

Results by ward

Abingdon

Brompton and Hans Town

Campden

Chelsea Riverside

Colville

Courtfield

Dalgarno

Earl's Court

Golborne

Holland

Norland

Notting Dale

Pembridge

Queen's Gate

Redcliffe

Royal Hospital

St Helen's

Stanley

References 

Council elections in the Royal Borough of Kensington and Chelsea
Kensington and Chelsea